Albert Ten Eyck Olmstead (March 23, 1880 – April 11, 1945) was an American historian and academic, who specialized in Assyriology.

Olmstead was born in 1880 in New York, and died in 1945 in Chicago.

He was Professor of Oriental History at the Oriental Institute of the University of Chicago. Among his doctoral students was Neilson C. Debevoise, later an influential historian of the Parthian Empire.

Works

Articles

References

Further reading

External links 

 
 

1880 births
1945 deaths
American Assyriologists
20th-century  American historians
University of Chicago faculty